
Gmina Głogów Małopolski is an urban-rural gmina (administrative district) in Rzeszów County, Subcarpathian Voivodeship, in south-eastern Poland.

Villages
Apart from the town of Głogów Małopolski, Gmina Głogów Małopolski contains the villages and settlements of Budy Głogowskie, Hucisko, Lipie, Pogwizdów Stary, Przewrotne, Rudna Mała and Wysoka Głogowska.

Neighbouring gminas
Gmina Głogów Małopolski is bordered by the city of Rzeszów and by the gminas of Kolbuszowa, Raniżów, Sokołów Małopolski, Świlcza and Trzebownisko.

References
Polish official population figures 2006

Glogow Malopolski
Rzeszów County